Right at Your Door  is a 2006 American thriller film about a couple and follows the events surrounding them when multiple dirty bombs detonate in Los Angeles. Chris Gorak both wrote the screenplay and directed the film in his writing and directorial debuts. It was first screened at the Sundance Film Festival in January 2006, where it won the award for Excellence in Cinematography.

Plot
Brad (Rory Cochrane), an out-of-work musician, is home by himself one morning while his wife, Lexi (Mary McCormack), is at work. He hears on the radio that several suspected dirty bombs have been detonated across Los Angeles, and sees large amounts of smoke rising from the city. Brad tries to contact Lexi through her cell phone, but only receives a busy signal, and when he tries to drive out to find her, he discovers that all roads now have police blockades, forcing him to return home.

Once home, Brad sees Alvaro (Tony Perez), in the house. Alvaro asks Brad if he can stay with him as there is no one at the neighbor's house where he was working. Over the radio, they hear that survivors of the blasts are being quarantined due to the bombs' deadly toxins, and that the authorities advise people to seal up their homes before the toxins reach them. Brad and Alvaro then proceed to seal up the house with duct tape and plastic. As it becomes increasingly obvious that Lexi might not come home, he takes some of Lexi's clothes and leaves them outside the back door with some food and water.

Lexi arrives home, covered in dust from the explosions, causing Brad to refuse to let her in. Lexi loses her temper and throws her cell phone at one of the door panes, breaking it. Brad and Alvaro quickly seal the breakage and manage to calm Lexi down, before then sealing off the main bedroom from the rest of the house so that Lexi can get into it. Lexi receives a call from her mother, who realizes that she was near the explosion and is probably infected, but Lexi refuses to believe that there is any danger. Alvaro decides to leave the house, saying he needs to be with his wife. Brad tries to convince him to stay, but Alvaro leaves anyway and is seen slowly walking away through a downpour of toxic ash.

Lexi hears a noise from the back and alerts Brad. A masked man appears, who introduces himself as Rick (Jon Huertas). He tells Lexi that there is a ship on the coast that has medical supplies and is helping people. Lexi and Rick leave for help, and Brad hears newscasts on the radio that elaborate on the unknown viral strain, saying it is a hybrid which attacks the respiratory system. That same night Brad is visited by Corporal Marshall (Max Kasch) and his men. He asks Brad several questions, such as how well his house has been sealed, who else is currently or recently been there, and if there has been any contact between him and anyone on the outside. Brad mentions the phone that Lexi threw the door window and the Corporal demands a sample of the dust off the phone. He tells Brad that he will soon be back with the results and that his wife under no circumstances should be let into the house.

Lexi returns home the next day without Rick, and sees a red tag placed outside the house. She calls her brother, Jason, (Will McCormack) so that she can have someone to talk to due to her mother being frantic with worry. The next couple of hours are spent with Brad and Lexi on their respective sides of the door, who talk about what they will do assuming they survive. Suddenly, soldiers appear and grab Lexi, and prevent Brad from coming outside. One soldier manages to calm Brad down and explains that the virus has been discovered not to thrive in places with large quantities of fresh air, meaning that the number of fatalities from the attack has actually been minimal.

Unfortunately, because Lexi unwittingly introduced a trace amount of the virus into the house when she broke a window, Brad's sealing off the house has created the perfect environment for it to thrive, meaning that he has been lethally exposed. The soldiers prepare to fill the house with powerful fumigation chemicals in order to eliminate any trace of the virus; Lexi protests that Brad is still inside, but is told that Brad will soon be dead no matter what they do. The house is then filled with the chemicals, killing Brad. Lexi is later seen sitting in an ambulance, being attended to by a nurse. The film ends with Lexi in too much shock to say anything, her cell phone ringing.

Cast
 Mary McCormack – Lexi
 Rory Cochrane – Brad
 Will McCormack – Jason
 Jon Huertas – Rick
 Jenny O'Hara – Lexi's Mother
 Scotty Noyd, Jr. – Timmy
 Max Kasch – Corporal Marshall
 Tony Perez – Alvaro
 Hector Luis Bustamante – Shop Owner

Reception
Rotten Tomatoes, a review aggregator, reports that 67% of 55 surveyed critics gave the film a positive review; the average rating is 6.3/10.  The consensus reads: "Though Right at Your Door dips into melodrama at the end, it's an otherwise tense, effective, and eerily plausible doomsday scenario."

References

External links
 
 
 
 

2006 films
2000s thriller films
American thriller films
Films set in Los Angeles
Films shot in Los Angeles
Films about terrorism
Films scored by Tomandandy
2006 directorial debut films
2000s English-language films
2000s American films